Jang Ik-jae (born 14 February 1973), also known as I.J. Jang, is a South Korean professional golfer.

Jang plays on the Japan Golf Tour, where he has won three times.

Professional wins (3)

Japan Golf Tour wins (3)

Japan Golf Tour playoff record (0–1)

Results in World Golf Championships

"T" = Tied

Team appearances
Amateur
Eisenhower Trophy (representing South Korea): 1994, 1996

Professional
World Cup (representing South Korea): 2005

External links

South Korean male golfers
Japan Golf Tour golfers
1973 births
Living people